Yeremkin is a rural locality (a village) in Niginskoye Rural Settlement, Nikolsky District, Vologda Oblast, Russia. The population was 6 as of 2002.

Geography 
The distance to Nikolsk is 21 km, to Nigino is 3 km. Koshelevo is the nearest rural locality.

References 

Rural localities in Nikolsky District, Vologda Oblast